is a retired judoka who competed in the half-middleweight (70 kg) division.

Life and career
Nomura was born into a family of judoka. His father was the founder of a local judo dojo, and his brother was also an instructor who taught Olympic gold medalist Shinji Hosokawa. His nephew, Tadahiro Nomura, is the only judoka to have won three gold medals at the Summer Olympics. Nomura himself attended Tenri University before starting work at the Hakuhodo company. He placed second in the World Judo Championships in 1969 and 1971, and won the All-Japan Judo Championships in 1972 to become the Japanese representative for the half middleweight division at the 1972 Summer Olympics. He won all five of his matches at the Olympics by ippon to capture the gold medal. He also won the 1973 World Judo Championships held in Lausanne, Switzerland. 

He has worked as a schoolteacher in Wakayama Prefecture since retiring from competitive judo.

See also
 List of judoka
 List of Olympic medalists in judo

References

External links

 

1949 births
Living people
Japanese male judoka
Judoka at the 1972 Summer Olympics
Olympic judoka of Japan
Olympic gold medalists for Japan
Sportspeople from Nara Prefecture
Olympic medalists in judo
Medalists at the 1972 Summer Olympics
20th-century Japanese people
21st-century Japanese people